Siedleszczany  is a village in the administrative district of Gmina Baranów Sandomierski, within Tarnobrzeg County, Subcarpathian Voivodeship, in south-eastern Poland.

The village has a population of 246.

References

External links 
 Tarnobrzeg

Siedleszczany